Gazoryctra mathewi, or Matthew's ghost moth,  is a moth of the family Hepialidae. It is known from western North America, including British Columbia, Washington and California. It has a wingspan of 34 mm.

References

Moths described in 1874
Hepialidae
Moths of North America